

Regular season

Season standings

Roster

Player stats

Awards and honors
Lori Dupuis, Most Valuable Player, Playoffs
Cindy Eadie, Central Division All-Star Team selection
Molly Engstrom, Central Division All-Star Team selection
Molly Engstrom, CWHL All-Rookie Team
Jayna Hefford, Central Division All-Star Team selection
Jayna Hefford, League Leader, Goals Scored (26)
Jayna Hefford, Brampton, Most Valuable Player, Regular season
Bobbi Jo Slusar, CWHL All-Rookie Team

References

See also
 2007–08 CWHL season
 Brampton Thunder
 Canadian Women's Hockey League

Brampton
Brampton Thunder
Bram